The ITU-T Study Group 15 (SG15) is a statutory group of the ITU Telecommunication Standardization Sector (ITU-T) concerned with networks, technologies and infrastructures for transport, access and home. It responsible for standards such as GPON, G.fast, etc.

Administratively, SG15  is a statutory meeting of the World Telecommunication Standardization Assembly (WTSA), which creates the ITU-T Study Groups and appoints their management teams. The secretariat is provided by the Telecommunication Standardization Bureau (under Director Chaesub Lee).

The goal of SG15 is to produce recommendations (international standards) for networks,

See also
ITU-T

References

External links 
 ITU main site
 ITU-T Study Group 15 web site

International Telecommunication Union
Computer networking